SMS Regensburg was a light cruiser of the  built by the German Kaiserliche Marine (Imperial Navy). She had one sister ship, . The ship was built by the AG Weser shipyard in Bremen, laid down in 1912, launched in April 1914, and commissioned into the High Seas Fleet in January 1915. She was named for the German town of Regensburg.

Regensburg served in the reconnaissance forces of the High Seas Fleet during World War I. She saw significant action at the Battle of Jutland on 31 May – 1 June 1916, where she served as the leader of the torpedo boat flotillas that screened for the I Scouting Group battlecruisers. After the end of the war, she was ceded to France in 1920 and renamed Strasbourg. In 1928 she took part in the Arctic rescue operations searching for the Airship Italia. Removed from service in 1936, she was used as a barracks ship in Lorient until 1944, when she was seized by the Germans and scuttled in the harbor to protect the U-boat pens there.

Design

She displaced  at full load. Her propulsion system consisted of two sets of Marine steam turbines driving two  propellers. They were designed to give . These were powered by ten coal-fired Marine-type water-tube boilers and two oil-fired double-ended boilers. She had a crew of 21 officers and 364 enlisted men.

The ship was armed with twelve  SK L/45 guns in single pedestal mounts. Two were placed side by side forward on the forecastle, eight were located amidships, four on either side, and two in a superfiring pair aft. These were later replaced with seven  SK L/45 guns and two  SK L/45 anti-aircraft guns. She was also equipped with a pair of  torpedo tubes with five torpedoes submerged in the hull on the broadside. Four deck-mounted launchers were added when the gun armament was upgraded, and the submerged tubes were removed. She could also carry 120 mines.

Service history
Regensburg was ordered under the contract name "Ersatz " and was laid down at the AG Weser shipyard in Bremen in 1912 and was launched on 25 April 1914; the mayor of Regensburg, Hofrat Josef Bleyer, christened the ship. She was commissioned into the High Seas Fleet on 3 January 1915. Regensburg completed her trials on 10 March 1915, and was then assigned to the II Scouting Group. Eleven days later, she bombarded Russian positions near Polangen and Papensee; the operation lasted until the 24th. Captain Hans Zenker proposed that Regensburg and the liner Cap Polonio—which was to be armed with 15 cm guns—should be sent out into the Atlantic to replace the commerce raiding cruisers that had been destroyed in the early months of the war. The fleet commander, Admiral Friedrich von Ingenohl, argued the ships would eventually be sunk as well, and that any possible successes for the raiders would not equal the loss of a modern light cruiser or a large passenger liner. The suggested plan was therefore abandoned.

On 17–18 May, Regensburg took part in a mine-laying operation in the area of the Dogger Bank. On 25 August, she went into the Baltic to bombard Russian positions again, this time on the island of Dagö, including the lighthouse in St. Andreasberg and the signal station on Cap Ristna. On 11–12 May, Regensburg participated in another mine-laying operation, this time off Texel. In September, she took part in anti-shipping sweeps in the Skagerrak and the Kattegat. In early 1916, she continued supporting mine-laying operations and reconnaissance sweeps into the North Sea. On 23–24 April, she participated in the bombardment of Yarmouth and Lowestoft, conducted by the battlecruisers of Rear Admiral Franz von Hipper's I Scouting Group.

Battle of Jutland

In May 1916, Admiral Reinhard Scheer, the fleet commander, planned to lure a portion of the British fleet away from its bases and destroy it with the entire High Seas Fleet. For the planned operation, Regensburg, commanded by Commodore Paul Heinrich, was assigned to serve as the leader of the torpedo boat flotillas that screened for the battlecruisers of the I Scouting Group. The squadron left the Jade roadstead at 02:00 on 31 May, bound for the waters of the Skagerrak. The main body of the fleet followed an hour and a half later. At around 15:30, the cruiser screens of the I Scouting Group and the British 1st Battlecruiser Squadron engaged; Regensburg was on the disengaged side of the German formation, but steamed to reach the head of the line of battle. Her crew noted that the British shells were falling well over their targets, which placed Regensburg in greater danger than the battlecruisers at which the British were aiming. By 17:10, Regensburg had reached the head of the line, and the battlecruiser  fired several salvos at her, mistaking her for a battlecruiser.

As the battlecruiser squadrons closed on each other, Regensburg ordered the torpedo boats to make a general attack on the British formation. The British had similarly ordered an attack with their destroyers, which led to a hard-fought battle at close range between the opposing destroyer forces, supported by light cruisers and the battlecruisers' secondary guns. Shortly after 19:00, Regensburg led an attack with several torpedo boats on the cruiser  and four destroyers. She disabled the destroyer  and then shifted fire to Canterbury, which turned away into the mist. By 20:15, the British and German main fleets had engaged, and Scheer sought a withdrawal; he therefore ordered the I Scouting Group to charge the British line while the rest of the fleet turned away. This was in turn covered by a massed torpedo boat attack, which forced the British to turn away as well. Regensburg and her torpedo boats were ordered to join the attack, but the I Scouting Group had passed in front of his ships, and he realized the British had turned away, which put them out of range of his torpedoes.

Having successfully disengaged, Scheer ordered Regensburg to organize three torpedo boat flotillas to make attacks on the British fleet during the night. At 21:10, Heinrich dispatched the II Flotilla and XII Half-Flotilla from the rear of the German line to attack the British formation. In the night, the High Seas Fleet successfully passed behind the British fleet and reached Horns Reef by 04:00 on 1 June. At 09:45, Regensburg and three torpedo boats turned around to rendezvous with the torpedo boats carrying the crew of the scuttled battlecruiser . In the course of the battle, Regensburg had fired 372 rounds of 10.5 cm ammunition and emerged completely unscathed.

Subsequent operations
In late October 1917, the IV Scouting Group steamed to Pillau, arriving on the 30th. They were tasked with replacing the heavy units of the fleet that had just completed Operation Albion, the conquest of the islands in the Gulf of Riga, along with the battleships of the I Battle Squadron. The risk of mines that had come loose in a recent storm, however, prompted the naval command to cancel the mission, and Regensburg and the rest of the IV Scouting Group was ordered to return to the North Sea on 31 October.

By October 1918, Regensburg was serving as the flagship of Commodore Johannes von Karpf, commander of the IV Scouting Group. The unit was to participate in a final, climactic attack by the High Seas Fleet. Admirals Scheer and Hipper intended to inflict as much damage as possible on the British navy, in order to secure a better bargaining position for Germany, whatever the cost to the fleet. On the morning of 27 October, days before the operation was scheduled to begin, Karpf ordered Regensburgs crew to take on a full load of coal and oil. One division of sailors refused to work and a watch from the engine room personnel changed into their shore-going uniforms and refused to work as well. The ship's First Lieutenant arrested the ringleader of the strike, after which the crew returned to work. On the morning of 29 October 1918, the order was given to sail from Wilhelmshaven the following day. Starting on the night of 29 October, sailors on the battleship  and then on several other battleships mutinied. The unrest ultimately forced Hipper and Scheer to cancel the operation.

As the mutinies spread, Regensburg was sent to Swinemünde, arriving on 7 November. That night, false reports of torpedo boats crewed by Communist revolutionaries had sailed to attack his ships reached Karpf. He ordered his ships to be laid up; the confidential materials carried aboard were destroyed and their ammunition magazines were flooded. When the fleet command learned of the incident, they replaced Karpf with Commodore Rohardt, who set about restoring the ships to seagoing condition. During this process, the IV Scouting Group moved to Stettin. The abdication of Kaiser Wilhelm II on 9 November, however, which indicated to Rohardt that his ships could no longer fly the Imperial ensign. He therefore placed Regensburg and Brummer out of commission. A new officer arrived in Stettin to serve as Regensburgs commander, but he had few officers and no crew. In December 1918, Regensburg escorted the British battleship , which was carrying the Allied Armistice Commission, to Kiel.

French service

Regensburg served in the newly reorganized Reichsmarine after the end of the war, through 1919. She was stricken from the naval register on 10 March 1920 and placed out of service. On 4 June 1920, the ship was surrendered to the Allies in the port of Cherbourg, France and transferred under the name "J" to the French Navy. She was renamed Strasbourg and served with the French fleet. After arriving in France in 1920, she received a new battery of French  anti-aircraft guns in place of her 8.8 cm guns. The rear superfiring 15 cm gun was removed and the 75 mm guns were installed where the 15 cm gun had been. She was commissioned into the French fleet in 1922.

She was initially home-ported in Brest, until she was transferred to Toulon in 1923, where she remained for the next three years. In 1925, she underwent a major overhaul, after which she made  on speed trials. Strasbourg participated in the Rif War in the mid 1920s; on 7 September 1925, she and the battleship Paris and the cruiser Metz supported a landing of French troops in North Africa. The three ships provided heavy gunfire support to the landing troops. In early 1928, a major earthquake struck Corinth, Greece; Strassbourg was among the vessels sent to aid in the relief effort. The international effort provided assistance to 15,000 people.

Also in 1928, she assisted in the search effort for the wrecked airship Italia, which had crashed on the polar ice northeast of Svalbard. In addition, Roald Amundsen, who had also joined the search effort, went missing himself. Strassbourg arrived in Tromsø, Norway, on 19 June, to search for both Italia and Amundsen's aircraft. The ship's bow was not designed to operate in an Arctic environment, and so the crew had to continually fix wood planks to the hull to protect it from the ice. While refueling from the tanker Durance, Strassbourg took on two FBA 17 seaplanes to assist in the search effort. On 30 August, Strassbourg located one of the floats from Amundsen's aircraft, confirming the loss of the plane. The search effort was called off on 17 September, and Strassbourg returned to Brest by way of Reykjavík, arriving back in France by mid October.

She remained in service until 14 June 1936, when she was placed in reserve. Her name was reused for the new battleship , so the old cruiser was renamed Strassbourg II on early 1934 and in November she was transferred to Landévennec. On 15 January 1936, she was moved to Lorient and used as a depot ship for the 6th Destroyer Division, thereafter being stricken from the naval register in June. After the Germans invaded France in 1940, they seized the ship and briefly considered restoring her to active service. Instead, the project was abandoned and the cruiser was subsequently used as a barracks ship in Lorient. She was moored next to the U-boat pens and rigged with barrage balloons and anti-torpedo nets to strengthen the defenses of the area. In 1944, she was scuttled in the harbor to protect the pens from torpedo attack. Her wreck remains in the harbor, and is visible at low tide.

Footnotes

References

Further reading
 
 

Graudenz-class cruisers
Ships built in Bremen (state)
1914 ships
World War I cruisers of Germany
Maritime incidents in 1944